Robert Peter Entwistle (6 October 1938 – March 2000) was an English professional footballer who played as a forward in the Football League for Rochdale, Accrington Stanley and Hartlepools United.

References

1938 births
2000 deaths
Footballers from Bury, Greater Manchester
English footballers
Macclesfield Town F.C. players
Accrington Stanley F.C. (1891) players
Hartlepool United F.C. players
Scarborough F.C. players
Llandudno F.C. players
Rochdale A.F.C. players
English Football League players
Association football forwards